Chiru (Naga) is a Southern Naga language spoken mostly in Manipur. The Chiru population numbers approximately 8,599. It is an endangered spoken in three districts of Manipur: Senapati, Noney district of Manipur and Cachar district of Assam. Chiru has been recognized as a Scheduled Tribe of Manipur by the government of India since 1956 under "The Scheduled Castes and Scheduled Tribes Orders (Amendment) Act, Act No. 63 of 1956" Dated 25 September 1956. The total population of the native speakers of Chiru is only 8599 (Census of India: 2011). The native speakers have high proficiency in Meitei language. The language is neither used in schools nor in radio or mass media. Older people read and write in Meitei language (Manipuri language). The younger generation of Chiru speakers prefers Roman script.

The Chirus are one of the earliest inhabitants of Manipur and Assam. Cheitharol Kumbaba, the Royal Chronicle of Manipur mentioned that King Meidingu Chalamba defeated the Chirus in 1554. This proves that the Chirus had settled in Manipur long before this period. It was also mentioned in the Royal Chronicles of Manipur that an incidence of Meitei King's incursion on Nungsai Chiru Village occurred on 22nd day of Wakching (December–January) 1729 during the reign of Maharaja Garibniwaz (Cheitharol Kumbaba: 1989:90). In spite of the considerably long period of their settlement in the two states (Manipur and Assam), the population of Chiru native speakers is shockingly very low. The growth rate of their population was extremely steady. This might be due to high mortality rate and low birth rate in the previous centuries.

The domain of language use for Chiru is very limited. The usage of Chiru by Chiru native speakers is specifically confined only at home domain and within the community among the native speakers. The language proficiency of Chiru native speakers ranges from bilingual to multilingual. The native speakers in Manipur have high proficiency in Meitei language (Manipuri language) and those in Assam have high proficiency in Hmar, Meitei language and Sylheti Bengali. Chiru speakers in Manipur generally speak Meitei language, Hindi or English while those of Assam speak Hmar, Sylheti Bengali, Meitei language or Hindi at the time of interaction with non-Chiru speakers. The Chiru native speakers in Manipur usually speak either Meitei language or Hindi in the market place, office etc. Moreover, they also speak Paior Thwhen they interact with, and  speakers respectively. On the other hand, Chiru speakers of Assam speak Sylheti Bengali, Meitei language or Hmar in the market places, offices or anywhere outside home domain. It is painful to mention that Chiru of Assam has not been recognized by the government of Assam. They are rather recognized as Hmar. Chiru is neither used in schools nor in radio or mass media. Even the children normally become bilingual at the minimum age of 5 since they acquire the second language in schools.

Geographical distribution
Chiru is spoken in the following locations of Northeast India (Ethnologue).
Manipur
Tamenglong district: Lamdangmei and Dolang villages
Kangpokpi district: Kangchup, Thangzing, Sadu (Thangthilon), Bungte, Nungsai, Dolang Khunou, and Uran villages
Churachandpur district: Charoi Khullen village
Thoubal district: Waithou Chiru
Bishnupur district
Assam: Budon Village, Cachar district (a village near Jiribam)
Nagaland (scattered)

See also 
 Meitei language
 Barman language

References

Southern Naga languages
Languages of Assam
Languages of Manipur
Languages of Nagaland